Khori is a village in the Huzur tehsil, Bhopal district, Madhya Pradesh state, India.

Khori may also refer to:

Places:
Khori Mahuwa subdivision in the Indian state of Jharkhand
Khori Mahua, a village in Khori Mahuwa subdivision
 Khar-Khori, Sibsagar, a village in Sibsagar tehsil, Sibsagar district, Assam state, India 

People:
Khori Ivy, an American football coach
Khori Dastoor, an American operatic soprano and actress

Other:
Khori, a dialect group of the Buryat language

See also
Kori (disambiguation)
Kora (disambiguation)
Korha (disambiguation)
Korra (disambiguation)
Koda (disambiguation)
Khora